The Socialist Party of Nepal is a democratic socialist political party in Nepal. It is led jointly by former prime minister Dr. Baburam Bhattarai and senior leader of the Terai-Madhesh region Mahindra Ray Yadav.

The party was formed after a split in the People's Socialist Party, Nepal, its members citing the authoritarian and power-oriented nature of Upendra Yadav as a factor. Veteran leaders of Terai-Madhesh such as Mahindra Ray Yadav and Ramesh Prasad Yadav also serve as the portfolios of the party.

History

Formation 
There were a months-long dispute in People's Socialist Party, Nepal when the party's executive president, Upendra Yadav didn't call a meeting with the central committee of the party. He neglected the demands raised within the party regarding inclusive leadership. Yadav was accused of being in path of formation of a regional party to a national party. Bhattarai faction conducted a two day meet of central committee members in Jadibuti, Kathmandu on 12 and 13 July 2021 which concluded in the formation of the new party was the only alternative left as the party leadership had been authoritarian and power oriented.  

Later a group of MPs, MLAs, and central working committee members of People's Socialist Party, Nepal led by former prime minister Baburam Bhattarai switched to the party. 

Senior leaders including Baburam Bhattarai, Hisila Yami, Mahendra Raya Yadav, Ganga Narayan Shrestha, Bhakta Bahadur Shah, Prashant Singh, Damber Khatiwada, Dan Bahadur Chaudhary, Durga Sob and Ramesh Yadav joined the party who were previously a central working committee member of the previous party. Majority of central committee members from Lumbini and Gandaki province joined the party. This included former ministers Dan Bahadur Chaudhary, Govind Chaudhary. Former constituent assembly members Muhammad Okil Musalman, Chinak Kurmi also joined the party.

Electoral performance

Legislative elections

Leadership

Party portfolios

See also 

 Baburam Bhattarai
 Mahindra Ray Yadav

References

 
2022 establishments in Nepal
Political parties established in 2022
Socialism in Nepal